List matches of Polish men's volleyball national team conducted by Andrea Anastasi, who was a coach of Polish national team from February 23, 2011 to October 24, 2013.

Achievements

Official matches

2011 FIVB World League

Pool A

Final round

Pool E

Semifinal

3rd place match

2011 European Championship

Pool D

Playoff

Quarterfinal

Semifinal

3rd place match

2011 FIVB World Cup

First round (Site A)

Second round (Site A)

Third round (Site A)

Fourth round (Site A)

2012 FIVB World League

Pool B

Final round

Pool F

Semifinal

Final

2012 Olympic Games

All times are British Summer Time (UTC+01:00).

Pool A

Quarterfinal

2013 FIVB World League

Pool A

2013 European Championship

Pool B

Playoff

Friendly matches

2011

2011 Memoriał Huberta Jerzego Wagnera

2012

2012 Memoriał Huberta Jerzego Wagnera

2013

2013 Memoriał Huberta Jerzego Wagnera

Polish men's volleyball national team